

The Frankfort Cinema was a sailplane manufactured in the United States in the 1930s and 1940s and which was used by the United States Army Air Corps as a training glider under the designation TG-1. It was a high-wing, strut-braced design with a fully enclosed cabin. Originally designed as a single-seater, a two-seat version designated the Cinema II was produced soon afterwards, and this design was put forward when the Army issued a requirement for training gliders. At the same time, the company was awarded production contracts for transport gliders, the CG-1 and CG-2.

However, Frankfort lacked the resources to quickly produce large numbers of gliders, and only 43 TG-1s were delivered. The TG-1 designation was also applied to 10 civilian Cinemas that were impressed into Army service.

Variants
Cinema baseline design
Cinema II two-seat version
TG-1 USAAF designation for Cinema II
TG-23 USAAF designation for one impressed Cinema I (serial n/o 42-57192)

Aircraft on display
 US Southwest Soaring Museum
 Western Antique Aeroplane and Automobile Museum

Specifications (Cinema II)

References

 
 NASM website

Cinema
1930s United States sailplanes
Glider aircraft
High-wing aircraft